The 2016 Minnesota Senate election was held in the U.S. state of Minnesota on November 8, 2016, to elect members to the Senate of the 90th and 91st Minnesota Legislatures. A primary election was held in several districts on August 9, 2016. The election coincided with the election of the other house of the Legislature, the House of Representatives.

The Republican Party of Minnesota won a majority of seats, defeating the majority of the Minnesota Democratic–Farmer–Labor Party (DFL). This was the first election for the DFL since it won a majority of seats in the 2012 election, after losing a majority to the Republicans in the 2010 election. The new Legislature convened on January 3, 2017.

Background
The last election resulted in the Minnesota Democratic–Farmer–Labor Party (DFL) winning a majority of seats, after losing a majority to the Republican Party of Minnesota only two years earlier in the previous election. This resulted in the Republicans losing the only majority they have had since the return of partisan elections to the Senate in 1976. In conjunction with the result of the House election, it also resulted in the return of all-DFL control of the Legislature since 2010 as well as the return of all-party and all-DFL control of the Legislature and governorship since 1990, which ended with the election of a Republican majority to the House in 2014.

Electoral system
The 67 members of the Senate were elected from single-member districts via first-past-the-post voting for four-year terms. Contested nominations of the DFL and Republican parties for each district were determined by an open primary election. Minor party and independent candidates were nominated by petition. Write-in candidates must have filed a request with the secretary of state's office for votes for them to have been counted.

Retiring members

DFL
 Terri Bonoff, 44th
 Barb Goodwin, 41st
 Alice Johnson, 37th
 Jim Metzen, 52nd
 Died of lung cancer on July 11, 2016.
 Roger Reinert, 7th
 Bev Scalze, 42nd
 Kathy Sheran, 19th
 Katie Sieben, 54th
 LeRoy Stumpf, 1st

Republican
 Dave Brown, 15th
 Julianne Ortman, 47th
 John Pederson, 14th
 Dave Thompson, 58th

Competitive districts
According to MinnPost, the Star Tribune, the Pioneer Press, and MPR News, a total of 19 districts were competitive. MinnPost considered 12 districts to be competitive—10 of which were held by the DFL and two by the Republicans, the Star Tribune 19—13 of which were held by the DFL and six by the Republicans, the Pioneer Press six—five of which were held by the DFL and one by the Republicans, and MPR News nine—seven of which were held by the DFL and two by the Republicans.

Primary elections results

Opinion polling

Results

District results

The following sought election but later withdrew.

Seats changing parties

See also
 Minnesota House of Representatives election, 2016
 Minnesota elections, 2016
 Minnesota gubernatorial election, 2014

Notes

References

External links
 Elections & Voting - Minnesota Secretary of State

2016 Minnesota elections
Minnesota Senate elections
Minnesota Senate